Jan Chesbro-Wohlschlag  (born July 14, 1958) is a retired high jumper from the United States, who set her personal best on July 1, 1989, jumping 2.00 metres at a meet in Oslo, Norway. She is a two-time indoor and outdoor (1988 and 1989) USA national champion.

International competitions

References
 Women's World All-Time List
 USA National Championships

1958 births
Living people
American female high jumpers
Athletes (track and field) at the 1991 Pan American Games
Pan American Games bronze medalists for the United States
Pan American Games medalists in athletics (track and field)
Place of birth missing (living people)
Competitors at the 1986 Goodwill Games
Competitors at the 1990 Goodwill Games
Medalists at the 1991 Pan American Games
21st-century American women